Zev Buffman (born Ze'ev Bufman) (October 11, 1930 – April 1, 2020) was a Broadway producer who served as president and CEO of Ruth Eckerd Hall in Clearwater, Florida.  He produced more than 40 Broadway shows. He partnered with Elizabeth Taylor to present her in her Broadway debut, The Little Foxes. Buffman was also the co-founding general partner of the NBA champion basketball team the Miami Heat.

Life and career
Buffman was born in Tel Aviv, Palestine, in 1930. His parents were early pioneers from Ukraine. His initial involvement in the performing arts began in 1947, while in the 89th Commandos. At the age of 16, he debuted as a stand-up comic throughout Israel, entertaining troops in periods of cease fire during the 1948 Arab–Israeli War. Zev served from 1947-1950, and returned for the Six Day War as well as the Yom Kippur War. He came to the United States as a foreign exchange student in 1951, moved to Hollywood, California, and worked as an actor while attending college. His first role was playing an Arab guard in the film Flight to Tangier. His most memorable film work was a role in the Cecil B. DeMille classic The Ten Commandments.

By 1960, he had produced his first Hollywood to Broadway-bound musical, Vintage 60, in partnership with Broadway's David Merrick.

In 1962, Buffman purchased and renovated the historic Coconut Grove Playhouse in Miami, Florida, and until 1971 he was the president/CEO/owner.  He also established the Coconut Grove Arts Festival.  In 1967 he ran the Parker Playhouse, Ft. Lauderdale's first theater, for 23 years.

From 1976 to 1990, he was President of the Jackie Gleason Performing Arts Center, located in South Miami Beach.  He helped renovate the theater complex and brought in Broadway performers, including Julie Andrews, Liza Minnelli, Angela Lansbury and Yul Brynner. The opening of the 3,000-seat performing arts center was part of the real estate comeback of South Beach and the nearby Lincoln Mall.

During the 1970s and early 1980s, he launched the "Zev Bufman Broadway Series" in Ft. Lauderdale, St. Petersburg, Palm Beach, Orlando, Jacksonville, Norfolk, New Orleans and Chicago, as well as the first three seasons of the Tampa Bay Performing Arts Center (known now as the Straz Center for the Performing Arts) in Tampa. Buffman sold his theatre interests to Pace Theatrical in 1988.

Buffman was a general partner/ producer at the Chicago Theatre from 1977-1981, along with partner Frank Sinatra. At this national landmark theater, he partnered with the city of Chicago to oversee a $50 million restoration and reopening. Upon completion, Buffman presented Broadway shows and concert performances by internationally known artists.

He also purchased and fully restored the vintage 1927 3,000-seat Saenger Theatre in the French Quarter in New Orleans.  Working with his partners at Pace Theatrical of Houston, the Saenger Theatre became a national landmark and New Orleans' new home for the performing arts.

In 1988, Buffman became the founding general partner of the NBA basketball team the Miami Heat with partner Ted Arison, owner of Carnival Cruise Lines.  Buffman also helped with the fundraising efforts to build the Miami Arena, where the Heat played until 1999.

In the 1990s, Buffman began a new partnership with Wayne Huizenga of Blockbuster Video to become a major player in the concert business. As the President/CEO he planned, built and oversaw four new 20,000-seat outdoor amphitheaters in Phoenix, Southern California, Charlotte and West Palm Beach. The venues were sold to SFX  in 1997.

In 2003, Buffman became CEO of RiverPark Center in Owensboro, Kentucky.  While there, he founded the International Mystery Writers' Festival.

In 2011, Buffman was named the President  & CEO of Ruth Eckerd Hall, Inc., a performing arts venue in Clearwater, Florida that also operates the Nancy and David Bilheimer Capitol Theatre.  He collaborated with the city on the renovation of this historic theater in downtown Clearwater, which reopened in December, 2013.  Ruth Eckerd Hall, Inc. also produced concerts for the Major League Baseball team the Tampa Bay Rays, and other organizations and events throughout the United States. Buffman retired in October 2018.

Other positions he held include:

Wolftrap Amphitheatre Galas and Co-chair/Producer with First Lady Mrs. Nancy Reagan
University of Tel Aviv Chair/Producer - Fundraising
New World Symphony Gala Producer - Co-Founder

Producing

Theater

Buffman became involved with producing Broadway shows while living in Hollywood, California.  The first show he produced was Vintage 60, an original musical revue that played at the Brooks Atkinson Theatre in 1960.  He has worked with James M. Nederlander, The Shubert Organization, and his partner of many years, Elizabeth Taylor.

He brought Taylor to her Broadway debut in The Little Foxes.  Later, he brought Elizabeth and Richard Burton together to the Broadway stage in the 1983 revival of Private Lives.  He also collaborated with Andrew Lloyd Webber as lead producer of the original Broadway production of Joseph and the Amazing Technicolor Dreamcoat.  Mr. Buffman has also produced many national tours.  From 1967-1995, Buffman produced shows as owner of Buffman Entertainment and Sports.  He also produced film, television and cast recordings of Broadway shows under his company, Zev Buffman Entertainment, Inc.

Motion pictures and television

 A five-year contract with Universal Studios as Producer- Special Projects.  With partner Hugh Hefner as co-Producer, they delivered the first part-animation, part live-action film The Naked Ape, based on the best-selling book by Desmond Morris.
A long-term contract with NBC and CTV (Canada) to produce a 39-segment series based on his Broadway hit show Story Theatre.
A pilot for ABC television, Fantasies Fulfilled, starring Walter Matthau, later to become hit series Fantasy Island.

Credits

Recording and music producing

Original cast albums:

Oklahoma!
Peter Pan
West Side Story
Buck White
Oh Brother
Story Theatre
Jerry's Girls
Joseph and the Amazing Technicolor Dreamcoat
Vintage '60

Broadway producing credits

Blithe Spirit (Broadway 2009)
Jerry's Girls (Broadway 1985-1986)
The News (Broadway 1985)
Requiem for a Heavyweight (Broadway 1985), starring John Lithgow & George Segal
Peg (Broadway 1983)
The Corn is Green (Broadway 1983)
Private Lives (Broadway 1983), starring Richard Burton & Elizabeth Taylor
A View from the Bridge (Broadway 1983)
Joseph and the Amazing Technicolor Dreamcoat (Broadway 1982-1983)
The First (Broadway 1981)
Oh, Brother! (Broadway 1981)
The Little Foxes (Broadway 1981), starring Elizabeth Taylor
Brigadoon (Broadway 1980-1981)
West Side Story (Broadway 1980)
Oklahoma! (Broadway 1979-1980)
Peter Pan (Broadway 1979-1981), starring Sandy Duncan
Ovid's Metamorphoses (Broadway 1971)
Paul Sills' Story Theatre (Broadway 1970-1971)
Buck White (Broadway 1969), with Muhammad Ali
Jimmy Shine (Broadway 1968-1969), starring Dustin Hoffman
Soldiers (Broadway 1968)
Mike Downstairs (Broadway 1968)
Your Own Thing (NY Drama Critics Award- Best Producer of a Musical)
Spofford (Broadway 1967-1968)
The Persecution and Assassination of Jean-Paul Marat as Performed by the Inmates of the Asylum of Charenton Under the Direction of the Marquis de Sade (Broadway 1967)
Minor Miracle (Broadway 1965)
Fair Game for Lovers (Broadway 1964), starring Alan Alda
Pajama Tops (Broadway 1963)
The Egg (Broadway 1962)
Vintage '60 (Broadway 1960)

Touring productions
Pajama Tops
Jimmy Shine, starring Dustin Hoffman
Porgy & Bess
Story Theatre
Peter Pan
Oklahoma!
West Side Story
Nine
On Your Toes
The King & I, starring Yul Brynner
Gypsy, starring Angela Lansbury
Jerry's Girls, starring Carol Channing
Applause, starring Lauren Bacall
A Lion in Winter, starring George C. Scott
A Man for All Seasons, starring Charlton Heston
7 Brides for 7 Brothers, starring Howard Keel

Awards/Honors

2010 Raven Award- Mystery Writers of America
State of Florida Ambassador of the Arts
The New York Drama Critics Award Best Musical (Your Own Thing, 1967-1968)
Nomination for 2009 Drama Desk Award Outstanding Revival of a Play (Blithe Spirit)
Nomination for 1983 Tony Award Best Reproduction (Play or Musical - A View from the Bridge)
Nomination for 1982 Tony Award Best Musical (Joseph and the Amazing Technicolor Dreamcoat)
Nomination for 1982 Drama Desk Award Outstanding Musical (Joseph and the Amazing Technicolor Dreamcoat)
Nomination for 1981 Tony Award Reproduction (Play or Musical - Brigadoon)
Nomination for 1981 Tony Award Reproduction (Play or Musical - The Little Foxes)
Nomination for 1980 Tony Award Reproduction (Play or Musical - Peter Pan)
Nomination for 1971 Tony Award Best Play (Tony Sills' Story Theatre)
Entrepreneur of the Year 2008- Owensboro, KY
Wharton School of Business- FL, Distinguished Achievement Award
Man of the Year Awards: Miami, Oklahoma City, New Orleans, Palm Beach, Baltimore, Miami Beach, Orlando, Tampa, St. Petersburg
Producer of the Year: Wolftrap Amphitheatre, Washington, D.C
Carbonnel Award- Named Best Producer six times (Florida)

References

1930 births
2020 deaths
American theatre directors
Israeli emigrants to the United States
Israeli Jews
Israeli people of Ukrainian-Jewish descent
People from Tel Aviv